George Akpabio (born 16 November 1992) is a Nigerian professional footballer who plays as a striker.

Club career

Plateau United
Akpabio made his professional debut for Plateau United during the 2011–2012 season, in which he became the club's all-time leading goal scorer, with 18 goals. He had attracted interest from the Norwegian club Viking FK, however he failed to transfer, since Plateau United were battling relegation, and they refused to let him go. In January 2012 Akpabio transferred to the South African club.

Ajax Cape Town
Acquired from Plateau United during the Winter transfer window of the 2011–12 season, Akpabio made his debut for Ajax Cape Town on 2 February 2012 against ZESCO, in an International friendly match with the club from Zambia, winning (3–1). He was acquired by Ajax Cape Town in January 2012 as a transfer from Nigerian club Plateau United making 10 league appearances during the second half of the season scoring once.

Vasco da Gama (loan)
For the 2012/13 season, Akpabio was loaned to Vasco da Gama, another club from Cape Town playing in the National First Division, making 17 league appearances, scoring 14 times, returning to Ajax Cape Town after serving his loan spell.

Chippa United (loan)
For the 2013/14 season, Akpabio was loaned to Chippa United, another club from Cape Town playing in the National First Division once again, helping his side to a successful promotion to the top flight during his loan spell.

Chippa United
On 5 June 2014 it was revealed that Chippa United had exercised their right to sign the striker, with Akpabio signing a 2,5 year contract with the club.

Yeni Malatyaspor
On 16 July 2015 it was announced that Akpabio had joined Yeni Malatyaspor, playing in the TFF First League, the 2nd tier of professional football in Turkey.

Hapoel Katamon Jerusalem 
On 22 January 2017 it was announced that Akpabio signed with Hapoel Katamon Jerusalem to play as striker in Liga Leumit, 2nd professional football league in Israel.

Career statistics

Club

Statistics accurate as of last match played on 22 October 2014.

1 Includes CAF Champions League, CAF Confederation Cup and CAF Super Cup matches.

2 Includes Telkom Knockout and MTN 8 matches.

References

1992 births
Nigerian footballers
Association football forwards
Living people
Plateau United F.C. players
Cape Town Spurs F.C. players
Vasco da Gama (South Africa) players
Chippa United F.C. players
Yeni Malatyaspor footballers
Hapoel Katamon Jerusalem F.C. players
Bnei Sakhnin F.C. players
Al-Nojoom FC players
Nigerian expatriate footballers
Nigerian expatriate sportspeople in South Africa
Nigerian expatriate sportspeople in Turkey
Nigerian expatriate sportspeople in Israel
Nigerian expatriate sportspeople in Saudi Arabia
Expatriate soccer players in South Africa
Expatriate footballers in Turkey
Expatriate footballers in Israel
Expatriate footballers in Saudi Arabia
Sportspeople from Jos
Liga Leumit players
Saudi First Division League players